Busan International Fireworks Festival (Korean: 부산국제불꽃축제), held annually in Gwangalli Beach, Busan, South Korea, is one of the most significant fireworks festivals in Asia. Tens of thousands of  fireworks and state-of-the-art lasers light up the sky in harmony with the theme song of the festival against a backdrop of the sea and  2 level suspension bridge, Gwangan Bridge.

History 
The Busan Fireworks Festival begins with a history that began to commemorate the 2005 APEC Busan Summit. In 2010, the festival attracted about 2.52 million visitors from all over the country and abroad. In 2011, the Busan International Fireworks Festival is held from October 21 to October 29, 2011. In 2012, it held from October 26 to October 28 at Busan Asiad Main Stadium, Gwangalli Beach and Gwangan Bridge. But the festival which was scheduled to be held on October 27 was delayed because of heavy rain. In 2013, it held from October 25 to October 26. In 2014, it held from October 24 to October 25. In 2015, it held from October 23 to October 24. It was held with Tsushima at the same time.

Criticism
In 2008, there was heavy traffic jam over the Busan. It took long time to pass the road, especially, traffic jams near Gwangalli Beach were more severe. In addition, some intercity buses passing through Gwangan Bridge were delayed or cancelled. The traffic was made worse by the many people gathered around Gwangalli Beach. Facilities such as hotels, restaurants and bars that were located near the event site were criticized by tourists because they raised their prices up to ten times. After the festival, Gwangalli Beach was full of so much trash because many visitors threw away newspaper and food waste along the road. The problem arose with the respect to the high probability of accident. Also basic facilities such as toilet were not enough. The environmental pollution was pointed out. Heavy metals and toxic substances diffused into the air and these contaminants sank into the Gwangalli Beach.

See also
 Gwangalli M Drone Light Show
 Seoul International Fireworks Festival
 Busan International Film Festival (BIFF) 
 List of festivals in South Korea
 List of festivals in Asia

References

External links

Busan International Fireworks Festival official website

Busan
2005 establishments in South Korea
Annual events in South Korea
Fireworks events in Asia
Festivals in South Korea
Festivals in Busan
Festivals established in 2005
Autumn events in South Korea